Lugdunum (also spelled Lugudunum, ; modern Lyon, France) was an important Roman city in Gaul, established on the current site of Lyon. The Roman city was founded in 43 BC by Lucius Munatius Plancus, but continued an existing Gallic settlement with a likely population of several thousands. It served as the capital of the Roman province of Gallia Lugdunensis and was an important city in the western half of the Roman Empire for centuries. Two emperors, Claudius and Caracalla, were born in Lugdunum. In the period  69–192 AD, the city's population may have numbered 50,000 to 100,000, and possibly up to 200,000 inhabitants.

The original Roman city was situated west of the confluence of the Rhône and Saône, on the Fourvière heights. By the late centuries of the empire much of the population was located in the Saône River valley at the foot of Fourvière.

Name
The Roman city was founded as Colonia Copia Felix Munatia, a name invoking prosperity and the blessing of the gods. The city became increasingly referred to as Lugdunum (and occasionally Lugudunum) by the end of the 1st century AD. During the Middle Ages, Lugdunum was transformed to Lyon by natural sound change.

Lugdunum is a latinization of the Gaulish *Lugudunon, meaning "Fortress (or hill) of (the god) Lugus" or, alternately, "Fortress of the champion" (if *lugus is a common noun cognate with Old Irish lug "warrior, hero, fighter").

The Celtic god Lugus was apparently popular in Ireland and Britain as is found in medieval Irish literature as Lug(h) and in medieval Welsh literature as Lleu (also spelled Llew).

According to Pseudo-Plutarch, Lugdunum takes its name from an otherwise unattested Gaulish word lugos, that he says means "raven" (κόρακα), and the Gaulish word for an eminence or high ground (τόπον ἐξέχοντα), dunon.

An early interpretation of Gaulish Lugduno as meaning "Desired Mountain" is recorded in a gloss in the 9th-century Endlicher's Glossary, but this may in fact reflect a native Frankish speaker's folk-etymological attempt at linking the first element of the name, Lugu- (which, by the time this gloss was composed, would have been pronounced lu'u, the -g- having become silent) with the similar-sounding Germanic word for "love", *luβ.

Another early medieval folk-etymology of the name, found in gloss on the Latin poet Juvenal, connects the element Lugu- to the Latin word for "light", lux (luci- in compounds) and translates the name as "Shining Hill" (lucidus mons).

Pre-Roman settlements and the area before the founding of the city

 
Archeological evidence shows Lugdunum was a pre-Gallic settlement as far back as the neolithic era, and a Gallic settlement with continuous occupation from the 4th century BC, during the La Tène period. It was situated on the Fourvière heights above the Saône river. There was trade with Campania for ceramics and wine, and use of some Italic-style home furnishings before the Roman conquest.

The Romans controlled the southern portion of Gaul by the 2nd century BC, founding the province of Gallia Transalpina in 121 BC. Gaul was conquered for the Romans by Julius Caesar between 58 and 53 BC. His description of the country in his De Bello Gallico is our principal written source of knowledge for pre-Roman Gaul, but there is no specific mention of the area in or around Lugdunum.

Founding of the Roman city
In 44 BC, ten years after the conquest of Gaul, Julius Caesar was assassinated and civil war erupted. Dio Cassius says this was to keep them from joining Mark Antony and bringing their armies into the developing conflict. Epigraphic evidence suggests Munatius Plancus was the principal founder of Lugdunum.

Lugdunum seems to have had a population of several thousand at the time Roman foundation. The citizens were administratively assigned to the Galerian tribe. The aqueduct of the Monts d'Or, completed around 20BC, was the first of at least four aqueducts supplying water to the city.

Within 50 years Lugdunum increased greatly in size and importance, becoming the administrative centre of Roman Gaul and Germany. By the end of the reign of Augustus, Strabo described Lugdunum as the junction of four major roads (the Via Agrippa): south to Narbonensis, Massilia and Italy, north to the Rhine river and Germany, northwest to the sea (the English Channel), and west to Aquitania.

The proximity to the frontier with Germany made Lugdunum strategically important for the next four centuries, as a staging ground for further Roman expansion into Germany, as well as the de facto capital city and administrative centre of the Gallic provinces. Its large and cosmopolitan population made it the commercial and financial heart of the northwestern provinces as well.

Lugdunum became an imperial mint during the reign of Augustus, in 15 BC, replacing mints in Hispania. It was probably chosen because of its convenient location between sources of silver and gold in Hispania and the legions on the Rhine and Danube. After 12 BC, it was the sole mint producing gold and silver coinage for the whole Roman Empire, a position it retained until Nero moved production back to Rome in AD 64.

Attention from the Emperors

In its 1st century, Lugdunum was many times the object of attention or visits by the emperors or the imperial family. Agrippa, Drusus, Tiberius, and Germanicus (born himself in Lugdunum) were among the gubernatorial generals who served in Lugdunum. Augustus is thought to have visited at least three times between 16 and 8 BC. Drusus lived in Lugdunum between 13 and 9 BC. In 10 BC his son Claudius (the future emperor) was born there. Tiberius stopped in Lugdunum in 5–4 BC, on his way to the Rhine, and again in 21 AD, campaigning against the Andecavi. Caligula's visit in 39–40 was longer, stranger, and better documented by Suetonius. Claudius and Nero also contributed to the city's importance and growth.

In 12 BC, Drusus completed an administrative census of the area and dedicated an altar to his stepfather Augustus at the junction of the two rivers. Perhaps to promote a policy of conciliation and integration, all the notable men of the three parts of Gaul were invited. Caius Julius Vercondaridubnus, a member of the Aedui tribe, was installed as the first priest of the new imperial cult sanctuary, which was subsequently known as the Junction Sanctuary or the Sanctuary of the Three Gauls. The altar, with its distinctive vertical end poles, was engraved with the names of 60 Gallic tribes, and was featured prominently on coins from the Lugdunum mint for many years. The "council of the three Gauls" continued to be held annually for nearly three centuries, even after Gaul was divided into provinces.

Southeastern Gaul became increasingly Romanized. By 19 AD at least one temple, and the first amphitheater in Gaul (now known as the Amphithéâtre des Trois-Gaules) had been built on the slopes of the Croix-Rousse hill. In 48 AD, emperor Claudius asked the Senate to grant the notable men of the three Gauls the right to accede to the Senate. His request was granted and an engraved bronze plaque of the speech (the Claudian Tables) was erected in Lugdunum. Today, the pieces of the huge plaque are the pride of the Gallo-Roman Museum in Lyon.

Suetonius reported Caligula's visit to Lugdunum in 39–40 AD at the beginning of his third consulate as characteristic of his reign. Spectacles were staged at the amphitheater to honor and entertain him and his guest, Ptolemy, king of Mauretania (whom Caligula later had murdered). A rhetoric contest was held in which the losers were required to expunge their work with their tongues. He auctioned furniture brought from the palace in Rome, assigning prices and purchasers. When Caligula wanted to get rid of Herod Antipas, King of Judaea, he sent him to exile in Lugdunum.

Claudius was born in Lugdunum in 10 BC and lived there for at least two years. As emperor, he returned in 43 AD en route to his conquest of Britain and stopped again after its victorious conclusion in 47. A fountain honoring his victory has been uncovered. He continued to take a supportive interest in the town, making the notables of the town eligible to serve in the Roman Senate, as described above.

During Claudius' reign, the city's strategic importance was enhanced by the bridging of the Rhône river. Its depth and swampy valley had been an obstacle to travel and communication to the east. The new route, termed the compendium, shortened the route south to
Vienne and made the roads from Lugdunum to Italy and Germany more direct. By the end of his reign, the city's official name had become Colonia Copia Claudia Augusta Lugudunenisium, abbreviated CCC AVG LVG.

Nero also took an interest in the city. Citizens of Lugdunum contributed four million sesterces to the recovery after the Great Fire of Rome in 64 AD. In the same year, the Lugdunum mint was closed an production shifted to Rome. A few years later, Nero contributed four million sesterces to the rebuilding of Lugdunum after a similarly devastating fire. Although the destructiveness of the fire is described in a letter from Seneca to Lucilius, archeologists have not been able to uncover a confirmatory layer of ash.

The Lyonnais admiration of Nero was not universally shared; tyranny, extravagance, and negligence fostered resentment, and coups were planned. In March 68 AD, a Romanized Aquitainian named Caius Julius Vindex, who was governor of Gallia Lugdunensis led an uprising intended to replace Nero with Galba, a Roman governor of Spain. The citizens of Vienne, however, responded more enthusiastically than the Lyonnais, most of whom remained loyal to Nero. A small force from Vienne briefly besieged Lugdunum, but withdrew when Vindex was defeated by the Rhine legions a few weeks later at Vesontio. Despite the defeat of Vindex, rebellion grew. Nero committed suicide in June and Galba was proclaimed emperor. The loyalty of Lugdunum to Nero was not appreciated by his successor, Galba, who punished some of Nero's supporters by confiscations of property.

In another turnabout for Lugdunum, Galba's policies were immediately unpopular, and in January, 69 AD, the Rhine legions quickly threw their support to Vitellius as emperor. They arrived at friendly Lugdunum, where they were persuaded by the Lyonnais to punish nearby Vienne. Vienne quickly laid down weapons and paid a "ransom" to forestall plundering. Meanwhile, Vitellius arrived in Lugdunum, where, according to Tacitus, he formally declared himself Imperator, punished unreliable soldiers, and celebrated with feasts, and with games in the amphitheater. Fortunately for Lugdunum, the would-be emperor and his army hurried into Italy, defeated Otho, and was in turn defeated by Vespasian and the army of the East, bringing the chaos of the Year of the Four Emperors to an end. Under Vespasian, the city briefly resumed production of bronze coinage, ending a shortage in the money supply that had developed in the previous years.

Despite a lack of imperial visits for most of the next century, Lugdunum prospered, until Septimius Severus and the Battle of Lugdunum (see below) brought devastation in 197 AD.

Growth and prosperity in the first centuries of the Empire

In the 2nd century, Lugdunum prospered and grew to a population of 40,000 to 200,000 persons. Four aqueducts brought water to the city's fountains, public baths, and wealthy homes. The aqueducts were well engineered and included several siphons. 

It continued to be a provincial capital with additional government functions and services such as the mint and customs service. Lugdunum had at least two banks and became the principal manufacturing center for pottery, metal working, and weaving in Gaul. Lyonnais terra cotta, pottery and wine were traded throughout Gaul, and many other items were crafted for export.

The city itself was run by a "senate" of decurions (the ordo decurionum) and a hierarchy of magistrates: quaestors, aediles, and duumvirs. The social classes of the time consisted of the decurions at the top, who could aspire to Senate status, followed by the knights (equites), and the Augustales, six of whom were in charge of the municipal imperial cult. This latter status was the highest distinction to which a wealthy freedman could aspire. Many of the wealthy merchants and craftsmen were freedmen. Below them were the workmen and slaves.

The Rhône and Saône rivers were navigable, as were most of the rivers of Gaul, and river traffic was heavy. The Lyonnais company of boatmen (nautae) was the largest and "most honored" in Gaul. Archeological evidence suggests the right bank of the Saône had the largest concentration of wharves, quays and warehouses. Lyonnais boatmen dominated the wine trade from Narbonensis and Italy, as well as oil from Spain, to the rest of Gaul.

The heavy concentration of trade made Lugdunum one of the most cosmopolitan cities of Gaul, and inscriptions attest to a large foreign-born population, especially Italians, Greeks, and immigrants from the oriental provinces of Asia Minor and Syria-Palestine.

There is evidence of numerous temples and shrines in Lugdunum. Traditional Gallic gods like mallet-bearing Sucellus and the mother goddesses called the Matres (depicted with cornucopiae) continued to be worshiped somewhat syncretistically along with the Roman gods. Additional religious cults came with the oriental immigrants, who brought the eastern mystery religions to the Rhône valley. A major shrine of the Phrygian goddess Cybele was built in nearby Vienne, and she also seems to have found special favor in Lugdunum in the late 1st century and 2nd century.

Christianity and the first martyrs
The cosmopolitan hospitality to eastern religions may have allowed the first attested Christian community in Gaul to be established in Lugdunum in the 2nd century, led by a bishop Pothinus—who probably was Greek. In 177 it also became the first in Gaul to suffer persecution and martyrdom.

The event was described in a letter from the Christians in Lugdunum to counterparts in Asia, later retrieved and preserved by Eusebius. There is no record of a cause or a triggering event but mob violence against the Christians in the streets culminated in a public interrogation in the forum by the tribune and town magistrates. The Christians publicly confessed their faith and were imprisoned until the arrival of Legate of Lugdonensis, who gave his authority to the persecution. About 40 of the Christians were martyred—dying in prison, beheaded, or killed by beasts in the arena as a public spectacle. Among the latter were Bishop Pothinus, Blandina, Doctor Attalus, Ponticus, and the deacon Sanctus of Vienne. Their ashes were thrown into the Rhône.

Nevertheless, the Christian community either survived or was reconstituted, and under Bishop Irenaeus it continued to grow in size and influence.

Battle of Lugdunum

The 2nd century ended with another struggle for imperial succession. The emperor Pertinax was murdered in 193, and four generals again "contended for the purple". Two of the rivals, Clodius Albinus and Septimius Severus, initially formed a political alliance. Albinus was a former legate of Britannia and commanded legions in Britain and Gaul. Septimius Severus commanded the Pannonian legions, and led them successfully against Didius Julianus near Rome in 193, and defeated Pescennius Niger in 194. Severus consolidated his power in Rome and broke his alliance with Albinus. The Senate supported Severus and declared Albinus a public enemy.

Clodius Albinus had settled with his army near Lugdunum early in 195. There, he had himself proclaimed Augustus and made plans to counter Severus. Albinus reopened the mint at Lugdunum, for the first time in over a century, issuing coins celebrating his "clemency", as well as one dedicated to the "Genius of Lugdunum." He was joined by an army under Lucius Novius Rufus, the governor of Hispania Tarraconensis. They successfully attacked the German troops of Virius Lupus but were unable to deter them from supporting Severus.

Severus brought his army from Italy and Germany toward the end of 196. The armies fought an initial, inconclusive engagement at Tinurtium (Tournus), about  up the Saône from Lugdunum. Albinus retreated with his forces toward Lugdunum.

On the 19th of February, 197, Severus again attacked Clodius Albinus to the northwest of the city. Albinus' army was defeated in the bloody and decisive Battle of Lugdunum. Dio Cassius described 300,000 men involved in the battle: although this was one of the largest battles involving Roman armies known, this number is assumed to be an exaggeration. Albinus committed suicide in a house near the Rhône; his head was sent to Rome as a warning to his supporters. His defeated cohorts were dissolved and the victorious legions punished those in Lugdunum who had supported Albinus, by confiscation, banishment, or execution. The city was plundered or at least severely damaged by the battle. Legio I Minervia remained camped in Lugdunum from 198 to 211.

Decline of Lugdunum and the Empire

Historical and archeological evidence indicates that Lugdunum never fully recovered from the devastation of this battle.

When mints began to be set up outside Rome after AD 260, there was a Gallic mint which may have been located at Lugdunum, but more likely at Trier, which was definitely the mint of the Gallic Empire. Aurelian transferred minting from Trier to Lugdunum in AD 274; it was the sole mint for the western empire.

A major reorganization of imperial administration begun at the end of the 3rd century during the reign of Diocletian and completed a few decades later by Constantine further reduced the importance of Lugdunum. This reorganization standardized size and status of provinces, splitting many of the larger. The new provinces were grouped in larger administrative districts. Lugdunum became the capital of a much smaller region containing only two cities besides Lugdunum: Autun and Langres. The new governor bore the title of consularis. The mint was retained at Lugdunum, as was an administrative tax office and a state-run wool clothing factory.

Lugdunum was no longer the chief city and administrative capital of Gaul. Although the city continued, there seems to have been a population shift from the Fourviere heights where the original Roman city was situated to the river valley below. Other evidence suggests other cities surpassed Lugdunum as trading centers.

Though the Western Roman Empire persisted until 476 AD, the border regions extending along the Rhine River in Germany to the Danube River in Dacia became far more important from a military and strategic standpoint. Cities like Augusta Treverorum (Trier) eclipsed Lugdunum in importance. The status of the western provinces declined further when Constantine made Byzantium (later named Constantinople after his death) the capital of the Eastern part of the Empire.

As the Western Empire disintegrated in the 5th century, Lugdunum became the principal city of the Kingdom of the Burgundians in AD 443. The Lugdunum mint remained in operation under the new rulers.

See also
 History of Lyon
 Abascantus

References

Sources
Cassius Dio. Roman History. XLVI, 50.
André Pelletier. Histoire de Lyon: de la capitale les Gaules à la métropole européene. Editions Lyonnaises d'Art et d'Histoire. Lyon: 2004. 
Seneca. Apocolocyntosis. VII.

External links

History of Lyon
Archaeological sites in France
 
40s BC establishments
43 BC
Roman fortifications in Gallia Lugdunensis
Roman towns and cities in France